Muhammad Kibirige Mayanja is a Ugandan politician who founded and served as the  first President of the Justice Forum party in Uganda. His first attempt at Politics was in 1994 when he contested for a Constituent Assembly (CA) seat in Kawempe North constituency, where he finished in second position. In 1996, the then little known Kibirige Mayanja took the country by surprise when he rose up to challenge President Yoweri Museveni for the country's presidency . True to his promise, he traversed the country in a three-man presidential bid, putting up a spirited campaign to the end of the race in which he obtained at least 2.5 percent of the valid votes cast, and finishing behind the leading two candidates, Yoweri K. Museveni and Ssemwogerere Paul Kawanga. A director of Planning and development at Makerere University at the time, Mayanja returned to his University job, and laid new strategies for recruiting supporters to his newly found Party, Justice Forum, famously called JEEMA by most Ugandans. He bounced back in the presidential race in 2001, which attracted a double number of candidates than the earlier one of 1996. In the 2001 elections, he completed in the fourth position. Ugandan Presidency .

Given his humble background and the courage to challenge the present leadership, Mayanja inspired many Ugandans at all levels who were hitherto political spectators to stand up to the challenge. He brought several youths into his Justice Forum party. Two of these eloquent youths Asuman Basalirwa and Yususf Kiranda became guild presidents at Makerere University, under his party sponsorship. After 14 years of steering the young party, Kibirige stepped down, handing over the party leadership to the youthful Asuman Basalirwa in 2005. Before working for Makerere University, where he spent ten years as a Planner, he had worked with the Ministry of Education for twelve years. He is now the Chairman of Justice Forum (JEEMA), and a Consultant in the East African region under a private company called Alphabeta project consultants for which he is the Chief Executive Officer.

References

Ugandan politicians
Living people
Year of birth missing (living people)